Deliochus is a genus of South Pacific orb-weaver spiders first described by Eugène Simon in 1895.

Species
 it contains five species:
Deliochus humilis (L. Koch, 1867) – Australia, Papua New Guinea
Deliochus idoneus (Keyserling, 1887) – Australia (Queensland, New South Wales, Tasmania, Western Australia)
Deliochus pulchra Rainbow, 1916 – Australia (Queensland)
Deliochus p. melania Rainbow, 1916 – Australia (Queensland)
Deliochus zelivira (Keyserling, 1887) – Australia, Tasmania

References

Araneidae
Araneomorphae genera
Spiders of Australia
Taxa named by Eugène Simon